Motorway 52 (A52) or Amvrakia Motorway (Greek: Αμβρακία Οδός, Amvrakia Odos) is a tangential motorway of the A5 (Ionia Motorway) motorway in Aetolia-Acarnania, Greece. The A52 is an important motorway for the tourist region of the Ambracian Gulf. Its construction should have been finished until 2012, however the crisis in the country delayed its completion. The Motorway connects the Airport of Aktio the Island of Lefkada and the A5 (Ionia Odos). The construction  started In July 2009. It will be 48,5 km long and it will have 4 lanes (2+2) with hard shoulder and median, but without emergency lane. As of 2022, the two separate sections (Vonitsa - Aktio with a length of 15 km and Ionia Odos motorway - Loutraki with a length of 17 km) are operational, having been opened to traffic in 2019 and 2022 respectively.  The other two sections should finish by the summer or fall of 2023.

Exit list

References

52
Roads in Central Greece